Sven Verdonck (born 26 December 1963) is a professional Belgian darts player.

Darts career
Verdnock has played darts professionally since 2001. He has never won a tournament, with his highest placements being making it to the semi finals in 2015 England Masters and 2014 British Classic. Verdonck wins of the 2015 Brussels Open he defeated Scott Waites of England.

He qualified for the 2017 BDO World Darts Championship.

References

External links
 Profile at Darts Database

Belgian darts players
Living people
British Darts Organisation players
1963 births
People from Zele
Sportspeople from East Flanders